Senegal competed at the World Games 2017  in Wroclaw, Poland, from 20 July 2017 to 30 July 2017.

Competitors

Karate
Senegal has qualified at the 2017 World Games:

Men's Kumite -60kg - 1 quota (Saliou Diouf)
Women's Kumite -61kg – 1 quota (Magatte Seck)

References 

Nations at the 2017 World Games
2017 in Senegalese sport
2017